Courtnee Alyssa Draper (born April 24, 1985) is an American actress. She is best known for her roles as Morgan Hudson in The Jersey, Sam in The Thirteenth Year, Megan Larson in Stepsister from Planet Weird,  Elizabeth in BioShock Infinite and Sarah Whitaker in Days Gone. For her performance in BioShock Infinite, Draper was nominated for a British Academy Games Award for Performer and won a Spike Video Game Award (Best Song) for her performance of "Will the Circle Be Unbroken" in the game (Draper later additionally recorded a version of "You Belong to Me" for the game's follow-up, Burial at Sea).  Draper was also a cast member on The Bold and the Beautiful from April to October 2002 as Erica Lovejoy.

Draper was born at the Naval Hospital in Orlando, Florida. Her mother served in the military. As a result, she has resided in and visited many areas of the United States (including Florida, Pennsylvania, Rhode Island, Arizona, and Hawaii) and Asia (including Japan, Okinawa, Korea and Hong Kong). She was introduced to old films and musicals at age five while living in Okinawa, Japan. Draper graduated from Loyola Law School in Los Angeles.

Filmography

Video games

References

External links

Courtnee Draper on Facebook

1985 births
Living people
Actresses from Orlando, Florida
American child actresses
American film actresses
American soap opera actresses
American television actresses
American video game actresses
American voice actresses
University of California, Los Angeles alumni
20th-century American actresses
21st-century American actresses